"Pure" is a single by the British music group The Lightning Seeds from their debut album Cloudcuckooland.

The song peaked at No. 16 in the UK. The track is the band's sole entry on the Billboard Hot 100's Top 40 in the United States, peaking at No. 31. It was the first of many chart hits for the band on the U.S. Billboard Alternative Airplay chart, peaking at No. 8 on the chart.

Background
The first Lightning Seeds single release, "Pure" is significant in that it was the first song Ian Broudie had "completely written and sung, ever". It was when producing a track for The Pale Fountains that Broudie was offered a chance to release some of his own material. He was originally apprehensive:

Nonetheless, Broudie proceeded to record "Pure" at a studio in Kirkby. 200 copies of the single were originally pressed, but after some radio play and attention at The Haçienda, the song soon sprang to mainstream consciousness.

Cover versions
The Greek synthpop duo Marsheaux covered "Pure" on their 2004 album E-Bay Queen.
English singer-songwriter Luke Sital-Singh released "Pure" as a single in May 2016.

Charts

References

1989 debut singles
The Lightning Seeds songs
1989 songs
Songs written by Ian Broudie
Song recordings produced by Ian Broudie
UK Independent Singles Chart number-one singles